El Carmel is a station on the Barcelona metro network, served by L5. It is part of the extension that opened on 30 July 2010.

Services

See also
List of Barcelona Metro stations

External links

Transport in Horta-Guinardó
Railway stations in Spain opened in 2010
Barcelona Metro line 5 stations